Lachlan Antony Elmer (born 7 June 1969 in Melbourne, Victoria) is a former Australian Field Hockey player who participated in two Olympic games.

Elmer was part of the Australia national field hockey team in both the 1992 Olympic Games and the 1996 Olympic Games winning a silver medal in 1992 and a bronze in 1996. He was praised by his teammates for his speed and agility which he showed in several games.

Elmer is the brother of James Elmer, bronze medal winner 2000 Olympics Australia men's hockey team.

Siblings: Cameron Elmer, James Elmer, Jessica Elmer and Dougald Elmer.

References

External links
 
 Hockey Australia

1969 births
Living people
Field hockey players from Melbourne
Australian male field hockey players
Olympic field hockey players of Australia
Field hockey players at the 1992 Summer Olympics
Field hockey players at the 1996 Summer Olympics
1998 Men's Hockey World Cup players
Olympic silver medalists for Australia
Olympic bronze medalists for Australia
Olympic medalists in field hockey
Medalists at the 1996 Summer Olympics
Medalists at the 1992 Summer Olympics
20th-century Australian people